Forfar Playfield railway station served the town of Forfar, Angus, Scotland from 1838 to 1848 on the Arbroath and Forfar Railway. This was the first station to serve Forfar. A through-station, Forfar railway station, opened a decade later.

History 
The station opened as Forfar on 4 December 1838 by the Arbroath and Forfar Railway. The station's name was changed to Forfar Playfield in 1848, although it closed later in the same year on 2 August.

References

External links 
rAILSCOT

Disused railway stations in Angus, Scotland
Railway stations in Great Britain opened in 1838
Railway stations in Great Britain closed in 1848
1839 establishments in Scotland
1848 disestablishments in Scotland
Forfar